The New Guinea long-eared bat (Nyctophilus microtis) is a small species of bat. It is found only in Papua New Guinea.

Taxonomy 
The description of the species was published by Oldfield Thomas in 1888, recognising the affinity with Nyctophilus timoriensis, the name ascribed to Australian vespertilionid 'long-eared bat' taxa. Thomas's description of a new species in the genus Nyctophilus was the first to indicate the diversity of the group, previously described as monotypic. The specimen is noted as having been collected at Sogere, South-east New Guinea by Henry Ogg Forbes, and deposited at the British Museum of Natural History, London.

References

Nyctophilus
Taxa named by Oldfield Thomas
Bats of Oceania
Endemic fauna of Papua New Guinea
Mammals of Papua New Guinea
Mammals described in 1888
Taxonomy articles created by Polbot
Bats of New Guinea